Shayne Warren Tiber D'Cunha (born 1 April 1996) is a retired Indian-born Australian professional soccer player who most notably played as a defender for Western Sydney Wanderers in the A-League.

Career
Born in Mumbai, Maharashtra in India, D'Cunha moved to Sydney, Australia with his parents in 2000 when he was four years old. His parents moved their family to Australia in order to give their children a better chance at life. D'Cunha started playing football at the local level at the age of five or six and soon choose it as his sport of preference over cricket. Eventually, D'Cunha joined the youth ranks of the Western Sydney Wanderers and played for Blacktown City.

D'Cunha was one of three players released by the Wanderers on 1 June 2016, along with Daniel Alessi and Alusine Fofanah.

In September 2016, D'Cunha joined Wellington Phoenix on trial.

International
D'Cunha has stated that had he thought about representing India internationally but after getting capped by Australia at the under-20 level, he pledged his allegiance to Australia.

Personal
Shayne D'Cunha attended the prestigious selective secondary school, North Sydney Boys High School in Crows Nest (North Shore) and graduated in 2014. He is one of the most recent alumni for the school, having represented Australia at an international level.

Shayne joined the Seminary of the Good Shepherd in Homebush to study for the Catholic priesthood in 2019.

Honours 
Blacktown City
 National Premier Leagues NSW: 2014, 2016
 Waratah Cup: 2014

References

External links 
 

1996 births
Living people
Footballers from Mumbai
Soccer players from Sydney
Indian footballers
Australian soccer players
Western Sydney Wanderers FC players
Association football defenders
A-League Men players
National Premier Leagues players
Australia youth international soccer players
Australian people of Anglo-Indian descent
Australian sportspeople of Indian descent
People educated at North Sydney Boys High School